Toby Arnold (born 11 September 1987) is a New Zealand rugby union player. Arnold currently plays for French club Lyon after signing in 2013.

Arnold generally plays in the fullback and wing positions.

He notably played for the Bay of Plenty Steamers in New Zealand's National Provincial Championship.

He has also played for the All Blacks Sevens team, making his debut in 2009. A year later he was included in the squad to the 2010 Commonwealth Games in Delhi.

Arnold gave up on his 2012 Olympics dream after a serious knee injury in that year left him rethinking his future.

References

External links
 All Blacks Profile
 
 
 
 

1987 births
New Zealand international rugby sevens players
Living people
Commonwealth Games gold medallists for New Zealand
Commonwealth Games rugby sevens players of New Zealand
Rugby sevens players at the 2010 Commonwealth Games
Commonwealth Games medallists in rugby sevens
New Zealand male rugby sevens players
Lyon OU players
New Zealand expatriate sportspeople in France
New Zealand expatriate rugby union players
Expatriate rugby union players in France
Bay of Plenty rugby union players
Sportspeople from Te Kūiti
Rugby union fullbacks
Rugby union wings
Medallists at the 2010 Commonwealth Games